Midnight Tales was an American horror-suspense anthology comic book series created by Wayne Howard and published by Charlton Comics from 1972 to 1976. The book was "hosted" by Professor Coffin (a.k.a. the Midnight Philosopher) and his niece Arachne (the book followed a standard formula where each issue's first story was a framing sequence divided up among the other stories). The setting, Xanadu University, was a tie-in with the Charlton series E-Man.

Charlton took the unusual step of giving Howard a "created by" credit on each issue's cover, providing a precedent for such credits eventually becoming common years later beginning with DC's Vertigo imprint. Charlton writer/editor Nick Cuti described Howard's credit being granted because the book, "... was his idea, his concept, his everything". In addition, each issue shared a theme: "One time it would be blob monsters, and I wrote three stories about blob monsters, and another time it was vampires ... and that sort of thing". Howard penciled and inked every cover and virtually every story, and occasionally scripted stories as well.

According to critic Mark Andrew:

Publication history 
Midnight Tales was part of a wave of new horror and suspense comics published by Charlton during this period. Its sister titles were the Charlton anthologies The Many Ghosts of Doctor Graves (with host Dr. M. T. Graves), Ghostly Tales (with host Mr. L. Dedd, later I. M. Dedd), Ghost Manor (with host Mr. Bones), Ghostly Haunts (with host Winnie the Witch), Haunted (with hosts Impy and then Baron Weirwulf), and Scary Tales (with host Countess R. H. Von Bludd).

Midnight Tales appeared bimonthly; altogether, it published 18 issues. In Oct. 1985, Charlton briefly revived the title as a reprint book, changing its name to Professor Coffin, and continued the numbering for three more issues before finally ceasing publication in 1986.

Besides Howard, other contributors to Midnight Tales included Nicola Cuti, Don Newton, Joe Staton, and Tom Sutton. George Wildman edited the book for its entire run.

References

External links
 

 

1972 comics debuts
Horror comics